The San Juan River (Spanish, Río San Juan) is a river of Uruguay. It empties into the Río de la Plata.

See also
List of rivers of Uruguay

References

Rand McNally, The New International Atlas, 1993.

Rivers of Uruguay
Río de la Plata
Rivers of Colonia Department